Pit 5 Dam is a run-of-the-river hydroelectric dam on the Pit River in Shasta County, northeastern California, about  south of Big Bend. It is part of the Pit 3-4-5 hydroelectric project owned by Pacific Gas & Electric Company.

Specifications
It has a gated spillway controlled by four  steel wheel gates, and a  diameter river outlet for regular releases. There are four 40 MW generating units, each fed by a -long penstock.

History
The dam and power station were authorized in 1942 and constructed as a wartime project, and the first power was generated on April 29, 1944. Construction of the dam and power station dewatered a stretch of the Pit River known as the "Big Bend". When the projects were relicensed in 2007, a minimum  release into the river was established, to provide recreation benefits such as boating and fishing, and to improve riparian habitat.

See also
List of dams and reservoirs in California

References

Dams in California
Dams in the Sacramento River basin
Gravity dams
Dams completed in 1944
Pacific Gas and Electric Company dams